Panther is a speech composition as electronic sounds (electronic music), composed by Juan Maria Solare after a text by Rainer Maria Rilke ("Der Panther"). Commissioned by the "Work-Group in Theater-Dance" (Tanztheater ArbeitsGemeinschaft) from the secondary school "Herder-Gymnasium", in Cologne (group conducted by Ligia Liberatori). The piece would be used for a choreography of the ensemble "Katastrophe Ballet". This composition was designed in Darmstadt and made in Cologne, in the studio of the composer, based on sound-samples of Ligia Liberatori (voice), Holger Müller-Hartmann (fagot), Gustavo Fontes (doublebass), Damian Zangger (tuba); and the voices of the pupils, in April and May 2001. [7'00"]

Compositions by Juan María Solare